Domunculifex littorinella is a species of air-breathing land snails, terrestrial pulmonate gastropod mollusks in the family Geomitridae. 

It is endemic to Madeira, Portugal. It is threatened by habitat loss.

References

External links
 Mabille, J. (1883). Diagnoses testarum novarum. Bulletin de la Société Philomatique de Paris, (7) 7 (3): 115-132. Paris
 Lowe, R. T. (1831). Primitiae faunae et florae Maderae et Portus Sancti; sive species quaedam novae vel hactenus minus rite cognitae animalium et plantarum in his insulis degentium breviter descriptae. Transactions of the Cambridge Philosophical Society. 4 (1): 1-70, pl. 1-6. Cambridge

Molluscs of Madeira
Gastropods described in 1883
Taxonomy articles created by Polbot
Taxobox binomials not recognized by IUCN